Ilias Kyritsis (born 14 October 1997) is a Greek professional footballer who plays as a goalkeeper for Super League 2 club Ierapetra.

References

External links
 

1997 births
Living people
Greek footballers
Super League Greece players
Football League (Greece) players
Gamma Ethniki players
Atromitos F.C. players
Ionikos F.C. players
Paniliakos F.C. players
Association football goalkeepers
Sportspeople from Frankfurt